Daryn McBride is a Canadian retired ice hockey right wing who was an All-American for Denver.

Career
McBride began playing for Denver a year after the team made a surprise run to the Frozen Four. The Pioneers sank back to the middle of the pack afterwards and McBride could only help the team finish a game above .500. After his freshman season the Pittsburgh Penguins took a flyer on McBride, using a 10th-round selection on him in NHL Draft. He rewarded the selection with a 30-goal season the year after and he led the Pioneers in scoring. Denver wasn't much better than they were in his first season and remained a mediocre team through the end of his junior season. Despite the lack of team success, McBride was named an All-American in 1989 and led Denver to the WCHA Championship.

McBride left school after his third season and joined the Canadian national team, remaining with the program for over a year before joining the professional ranks in 1990. He spent parts of two seasons bouncing between minor professional leagues in the US before heading over to Europe in 1992. McBride played two years for HC Gherdëina before ending his career with Neusser EC in the German second league.

After retiring, McBride became a financial advisor for professional athletes and has been working in the field since 1996.

Statistics

Regular season and playoffs

Awards and honors

References

External links

1968 births
Living people
Ice hockey people from Alberta
People from Fort Saskatchewan
Canadian ice hockey right wingers
Denver Pioneers men's ice hockey players
AHCA Division I men's ice hockey All-Americans
New Haven Nighthawks players
Phoenix Roadrunners (IHL) players
Utica Devils players
Cincinnati Cyclones players
Pittsburgh Penguins draft picks